William Tash was a landowner in Edmonton, Middlesex, England, in the eighteenth and nineteenth centuries. He owned 85 plots of land in Edmonton and was the lord of the manors of Bowes and Dernsford. He was one of those who received land following the enclosure of Enfield Chase in 1777. He lived at Broomfield House and was one of the trustees of the Weld Chapel at Southgate. He played a significant role in the argument about the disposal of the living of that chapel that took place in 1813.

References 

Lords of the Manor
Edmonton, London
Year of birth missing
Year of death missing